Sandy River may refer to:

Rivers in the United States
 Sandy River (Chandler Bay), Jonesport, Maine
 Sandy River (Kennebec River) in Maine
 Sandy River (Mississippi River), a tributary of the Mississippi River in Minnesota
 Sandy River (Red Lake), a tributary of Lower Red Lake in Minnesota
 Sandy River (Oregon)
 Sandy River (South Carolina)
 Sandy River (Bush River tributary), Virginia
 Sandy River (Dan River tributary), Virginia
 Upper Sandy River, in the Alaska Peninsula National Wildlife Refuge

Settlements in the United States
 Sandy River Plantation, Maine, a municipality in Maine
 Sandy River, Virginia, Pittsylvania County

See also
 Big Sandy River (disambiguation)
 Little Sandy River (disambiguation)
 Sandy River Airport, Sandy, Oregon
 Sandy Rivers
 Sandy (disambiguation)